Funambule means tightrope walker in the French language. Specifically it may refer to:

 the Funambule funicular, a funicular railway in the Swiss city of Neuchâtel
 the Funambule (album), the fourth studio album of Grand Corps Malade
 the Théâtre des Funambules, a former theater in Paris, France